New York's 14th State Assembly district is one of the 150 districts in the New York State Assembly. It has been represented by Jake Blumencrranz since 2023, succeeding Michael Montesano.

Geography
District 15 is in Nassau County. It contains the town of Oyster Bay and portions of Hicksville.

Recent election results

2022

2020

2018

2016

2014

2012

2010

2010 special

References

15
Nassau County, New York